Marbled meat is meat, especially red meat, that contains various amounts of intramuscular fat, giving it an appearance similar to marble.

Important terms defined 
Beef quality grades - A quality grade is a composite evaluation of factors that affect palatability of meat (tenderness, juiciness, and flavor). These factors include carcass maturity, firmness, texture, and color of lean, and the amount and distribution of marbling within the lean. Beef carcass quality grading is based on (1) degree of marbling and (2) degree of maturity.

Marbling - (intramuscular fat) is the intermingling or dispersion of fat within the lean. Graders evaluate the amount and distribution of marbling in the ribeye muscle at the cut surface after the carcass has been ribbed between the 12th and 13th ribs. Degree of marbling is the primary determination of quality grade.

Maturity refers to the physiological age of the animal rather than the chronological age. Because the chronological age is virtually never known, physiological maturity is used; the indicators are bone characteristics, ossification of cartilage, and the color and texture of ribeye muscle. Cartilage becomes bone, lean color darkens and texture becomes coarser with increasing age. Cartilage and bone maturity receives more emphasis because lean color and texture can be affected by other postmortem factors.

Beef yield grades - In beef, yield grades estimate the amount of boneless, closely trimmed retail cuts from the high-value parts of the carcass–the round, loin, rib, and chuck. However, they also show differences in the total yield of retail cuts. We expect a YG 1 carcass to have the highest percentage of boneless, closely trimmed retail cuts, or higher cutability, while a YG 5 carcass would have the lowest percentage of boneless, closely trimmed retail cuts, or the lowest cutability. The USDA Yield Grades are rated numerically and are 1, 2, 3, 4, and 5. Yield Grade 1 denotes the highest yielding carcass and Yield Grade 5, the lowest.

United States grading system 
The USDA's grading system, which has been designed to reward marbling, has eight different grades; Prime, Choice, Select, Standard, Commercial, Utility, Cutter and Canner. Prime has the highest marbling content when compared to other grades, and is capable of fetching a premium at restaurants and supermarkets. Choice is the grade most commonly sold in retail outlets, and Select is sold as a cheaper option in many stores. Prime, Choice, Select and Standard are commonly used in the younger cattle (under 42 months of age), and Commercial, Utility, Canner and Cutter are used in older cattle carcasses which are not marketed as wholesale beef "block" meat, but as material used in ground products and cheaper steaks for family restaurants.

See also

 Artificial marbling
 Boston butt
 Entrecôte

 List of steak dishes
 Piedmontese beef
 Rib eye steak

References

Meat